Microcerotermes heimi, is a species of small termite of the genus Microcerotermes. It is found from Maharashtra area of India and from Sri Lanka. It can be found from forests, in dead stumps and under bark of trees.

References

External links
Evolution and Systematic Significance of Wing Micro-sculpturing
Light as a limiting factor in the flight behaviour of termite

Termites
Insects described in 1902